The season 2007–08 Tercera División was fourth tier of football in Spain. Play started on 26 August 2007 and ended 18 May 2008.

Overview
There were 364 clubs competing in  Tercera División (Third division) in the 2007–08 season, divided into 18 regional groups, each accommodating between 20 and 21 clubs.

The following clubs finished as champions of their respective groups

Grupo I (Galicia) - Ciudad Santiago
Grupo II (Asturias) - Real Oviedo
Grupo III (Cantabria) - Gimn. Torrelavega
Grupo IV (País Vasco) - Portugalete
Grupo V (Cataluña) - Barcelona Atlètic
Grupo VI (Comunidad Valenciana) - Alzira
Grupo VII (Comunidad de Madrid) - Ciempozuelos
Grupo VIII (Castilla & León) - Mirandés
Grupo IX (Andalucía Oriental (Almería, Granada, Jaén & Málaga) & Melilla) - Roquetas
Grupo X (Andalucía Occidental (Cádiz, Córdoba, Huelva & Sevilla) & Ceuta) - San Fernando
Grupo XI (Islas Baleares) - Atlético Baleares
Grupo XII (Canarias) - Atlético Granadilla
Grupo XIII (Región de Murcia) - Ciudad Lorquí
Grupo XIV (Extremadura) - Don Benito
Grupo XV (Navarra) - Izarra
Grupo XVI (La Rioja) - Alfaro
Grupo XVII (Aragón) - Ejea
Grupo XVIII (Castilla-La Mancha) - Toledo

The top 4 teams from each regional group were eligible to progress to the promotion playoffs divided into 18 sub-groups. The 18 sub-group winners were promoted to Segunda División B.

League standings

Group I - Galicia

Top scorer

Goalkeeper

Group II - Asturias

Top scorer

Goalkeeper

Group III - Cantabria

Top scorer

Goalkeeper

Group IV - Basque Country

Top scorer

Goalkeeper

Grupo V - Catalonia

Top scorer

Goalkeeper

Grupo VI - Valencian Community

Top scorer

Goalkeeper

Group VII - Community of Madrid

Top scorer

Goalkeeper

Group VIII - Castilla and León

Top scorer

Goalkeeper

Group IX - Eastern Andalusia and Melilla

Top scorer

Goalkeeper

Group X - Western Andalusia and Ceuta

Top scorer

Goalkeeper

Group XI - Balearic Islands

Top scorer

Goalkeeper

Grupo XII - Canary Islands

Top scorer

Goalkeeper

Grupo XIII - Region of Murcia

Top scorer

Goalkeeper

Group XIV - Extremadura

Top scorer

Goalkeeper

Group XV - Navarra

Top scorer

Goalkeeper

Group XVI - La Rioja

Top scorer

Goalkeeper

Group XVII - Aragón

Top scorer

Goalkeeper

Group XVIII - Castilla-La Mancha

Top scorer

Goalkeeper

Promotion play-offs

Group Winners 
Promoted to Segunda División B as group winners: Ciudad Santiago, Sporting B, Racing B, Barcelona Atlètic, Sant Andreu, Alzira, Valencia Mestalla, Navalcarnero, Roquetas, Antequera, San Fernando, Linense, Atlético Baleares, Santa Eulàlia, Las Palmas Atlético, Ciudad Lorquí, Sangonera Atl. and Real Murcia B.

Notes

External links
 Real Federación Española de Fútbol
Futbolme.com
Lapreferente.com

 
Tercera División seasons
4
Spanish